The O'Neill is a 1912 American silent film produced by Kalem Company and distributed by General Films. It was directed by Sidney Olcott with himself, Gene Gauntier and Jack J. Clark in the leading roles.

Cast
 Gene Gauntier
 Jack J. Clark
 Sidney Olcott
 Robert Vignola

Production notes
The film was shot in Beaufort, County Kerry, Ireland, during the summer of 1911.

References
 Michel Derrien, Aux origines du cinéma irlandais: Sidney Olcott, le premier oeil, TIR 2013.

External links

 The O'Neill website dedicated to Sidney Olcott

1912 films
American drama films
American silent short films
Films set in Ireland
Films shot in Ireland
Films directed by Sidney Olcott
1912 short films
1912 drama films
American black-and-white films
1910s American films
Silent American drama films